The 1955 Boston University Terriers football team was an American football team that represented Boston University as an independent during the 1955 college football season. In its ninth season under head coach Aldo Donelli, the team compiled a 2–6 record and was outscored by a total of 174 to 113.

Schedule

References

Boston University
Boston University Terriers football seasons
Boston University Terriers football